Behemoth is a creature from the Book of Job, a book from the Hebrew Bible.

Behemoth may also refer to:

Books
 Behemoth (Hobbes book), also The Long Parliament, a 1682 book by Thomas Hobbes
 Behemoth (novel), a 2010 novel by Scott Westerfeld
 Behemoth, an omnibus volume of Stephen Baxter's The Mammoth Trilogy
 Behemoth: The Structure and Practice of National Socialism, a 1944 book by Franz Leopold Neumann
 Behemoth Comics, a comic book publisher distributed globally by Simon & Schuster

Film and TV
 Behemoth, the Sea Monster, a 1958 science fiction film
 Behemoth (2011 film), Canadian film about a huge monster that lives under the Earth near the town of Ascension
 Behemoth (2015 film), Chinese documentary film
 Behemoth (robot), a competitor from TV series Robot Wars

Fictional characters
 Behemoth, an Endbringer in the web serial Worm
 Behemoth, a member of the Hybrid DC Comics supervillain group
 The Behemoth, a computer from the children's series Dark Season
 Behemoth (Air Gear), a fictional team in the manga/anime Air Gear
 Behemoth, a gigantic mobile artillery walker carrying with 3 barrels that modified from original "Juggernaut" unit in the game Command & Conquer 3: Kane's Wrath
 Behemoth, a popular monster in the Final Fantasy series
 Behemoth, an enemy airship in Jak and Daxter: The Lost Frontier
 Behemoth, a magical beast in the role-playing game Dungeons and Dragons
 Behemoth, the son of Bolivar, Donald Duck's non-anthropomorphic pet St. Bernard
 Behemoth, a minor character from Once Upon a Time
 Behemoth, a character for the game Evolve
Behemoth (Master and Margarita), a large, mischievous, talking cat in the novel The Master and Margarita by Mikhail Bulgakov
 Behemoth, a character from The Muppets
 Behemoth, the demon summoned by the village children in the film The Blood on Satan's Claw
 Behemoth, one of 17 Titans from the 2019 film Godzilla: King of the Monsters in the film awoken by King Ghidorah along side the other titans it has a mammoth like appearance It also appears in Godzilla Dominion

Music
 Behemoth (band), a Polish blackened death metal band
 "Behemoth", a song by Raven from their 1988 album Nothing Exceeds Like Excess
 "Behemoth" (Static-X song), a song by Static-X from their 2007 album Cannibal
 "Behemoth", a song by Electric Wizard from their 1995 eponymous album
 "Behemoth", a song by Tad from the 1989 album God's Balls
 "Behemoth", a song by The Famine from the 2008 album The Raven and the Reaping
 "Behemoth", a song by Rob Sonic from the 2004 album Telicatessen
 "The Behemoth", a song by The Shadows of Knight from the 1966 album Back Door Men
 "The Behemoth", a song by The Acacia Strain from the 2008 album Continent

Other
 Behemoth (ammonite), an extinct cephalopod
 Behemoth (roller coaster), a steel roller coaster at Canada's Wonderland 
 Operation Behemoth, a codename of a series of large-scale Soviet naval exercises in 1989 and 1991
 The Behemoth, a video game development company in San Diego, California
 Behemoth, a GWR 3031 Class locomotive
 BEHEMOTH - Big Electronic Human Energized Machine, Only Too Heavy, an electric bicycle
 Behemoth (horse), Australian racehorse
 Behemoth (video game), A VR 2023 game developed by Skydance Interactive.